The Cork Bulls are an Irish rugby league team based in Cork, Ireland. They play in the Munster Conference of the Irish Elite League.

The Cork Bulls were formed in 2010.

Honours
 Irish Elite League (1): 2001

References

Irish rugby league teams
Sports clubs in County Cork
Rugby clubs established in 2010
2010 establishments in Ireland